Tahilalats, also known as Mindblowon, is an Indonesian-language webcomic which is created, written and illustrated by Nurfadli Mursyid. First published through the Instagram account @tahilalats in 2014, the daily four-panel comic is one of the most-followed webcomics in Indonesia, being published primarily via WEBTOON and social media platforms such as Instagram and Facebook. The webcomic follows the slice of life genre, generally with the addition of over-exaggerated, absurd twists.

History
In an interview with Antara News, Mursyid stated that he had been creating picture stories since he was child, unaware of the existence of comics. During his civil engineering studies in a polytechnic in Makassar, Mursyid became an illustrator for a local newspaper. Upon his graduation, he accepted a job offer from Jakarta-based social media company Dagelan. Mursyid's parents did not support his career choice until he got a stable income from it. Around this time, he began publishing four-panel comics through Instagram account @tahilalats (Tahi lalat is Indonesian for nevus, a large one of which is prominent on Mursyid's face while Mind Blowon is a portmanteau of mind blown and blo'on, an Indonesian slang for "dumb"). While he had begun publishing webcomics on his personal blog by 2013, it did not gain much attention. Contrary to the locally popular manga-styled webcomics of the time, Mursyid opted for a simpler style in order to deliver surreal stories akin to some western webcomics.

Due to the webcomic's rising popularity in social media, Mursyid received and accepted an offer from WEBTOON to become a contributor. Later in December 2015, he went to South Korea along with other popular Indonesian webcomic authors, attending the 2015 Webtoonist Day. A collection of Tahilalat strips was released in form of physical comic book in April 2017. Published by Loveable Publishers, the comic book was released as a limited print.

Style
In general, the webcomic satirizes various daily activities of Indonesian teenagers and young adults ranging from having meals, taking examinations, driving, etc. by adding an absurd plot twist at later panels. Mursyid is self-taught, and most of inspiration comes from his own everyday life. Tahilalats''' artstyle is inspired by western webcomics; Mursyid stated that this style "works fairly well for a comic strip with surreal storylines. Simple, but people get the idea." Most strips of Tahilalats are one-shots, although in several cases a page would be related to another one published afterwards.

ReceptionTahilalats'' has become one of the most popular webcomics in Indonesia, with nearly 3 million subscribers through WEBTOON and 2.4 million Instagram followers, excluding its presence in other social media websites. In May 2017, it was placed second between other Indonesian webcomics registered in WEBTOON, where Indonesians form the largest user base of the service.

References

External links
 Tahilalats on Instagram
 Tahilalats on WEBTOON

2010s webcomics
2014 webcomic debuts
Indonesian comedy webcomics
Gag-a-day comics
Yonkoma